"Like They Say in L.A." is a song recorded by East L.A. Car Pool in 1975. The song was issued as a non-album single.

It became the group's only hit during the summer of the year, reaching #72 in the United States.  The song was a much bigger Easy Listening hit, reaching #10.  On the Canadian Adult Contemporary chart, the song reached #28.

The song was subsequently re-recorded by the group, and that version of "Like They Say in L.A." has been published to YouTube.

Chart history

See also
List of one-hit wonders in the United States

References

External links
 Lyrics of this song
  (re-recorded version)

1975 songs
1975 singles
Songs about Los Angeles
Disco songs